The 100 is an American post-apocalyptic science fiction drama television series developed by Jason Rothenberg, which premiered on March 19, 2014, on The CW. It is loosely based on a 2013 book of the same name, the first in a book series by Kass Morgan. The series follows a group of teens as they become the first people from a space habitat to return to Earth after a devastating nuclear apocalypse.

Series overview

Episodes

Season 1 (2014)

Season 2 (2014–15)

Season 3 (2016)

Season 4 (2017)

Season 5 (2018)

Season 6 (2019)

Season 7 (2020)

Ratings

Season 1

Season 2

Season 3

Season 4

Season 5

Season 6

Season 7

Summary

References

External links 
 
 

Episodes
Lists of American drama television series episodes
Lists of American science fiction television series episodes